The 2022 Women's World Ice Hockey Championships was the 24th such series of tournaments organised by the International Ice Hockey Federation. Teams participate at several levels of competition. The tournaments also served as qualifications for the 2023 competition.

Host countries

Championship (Top Division)

After the top division was paused every four years (during the Olympics), a new proposal called for the tournament to be played every year from 2022 onward. The proposal was adopted on 22 September 2021. The tournament was held in Herning and Frederikshavn, Denmark from 25 August to 4 September 2022.

Division I

Group A
The Division I Group A tournament was played in Angers, France, from 24 to 30 April 2022.

Group B
The Division I Group B tournament was played in Katowice, Poland, from 8 to 14 April 2022.

Division II

Group A
The Division II Group A tournament was played in Jaca, Spain, from 3 to 8 April 2022.

Group B
The Division II Group B tournament was played in Zagreb, Croatia, from 17 to 22 May 2022.

Division III

Group A
The Division III Group A tournament was played in Sofia, Bulgaria, from 4 to 7 April 2022.

Group B
The Division III Group B tournament was played in Belgrade, Serbia, from 22 to 25 March 2022.

References

External links
Official website of IIHF

 
World Ice Hockey Championships - Women's
IIHF Women's World Ice Hockey Championships